There have been three baronetcies created for persons with the surname Laurie, one in the Baronetage of Nova Scotia and two in the Baronetage of the United Kingdom. One creation is extant as of 2007.

The Laurie Baronetcy, of Maxwelton in the County of Dumfries, was created in the Baronetage of Nova Scotia on 27 March 1685 for Robert Laurie. The fourth Baronet represented Dumfries in the House of Commons while the fifth Baronet sat for Dumfriesshire. The title became extinct on the death of the sixth Baronet in 1848. The Scottish song Annie Laurie is about Annie, the daughter of the first Baronet, and her romance with William Douglas.

The Bayley, later Laurie Baronetcy, of Bedford Square in the County of Middlesex, was created in the Baronetage of the United Kingdom on 15 March 1834 for John Bayley, a Judge of the Queen's Bench, Baron of the Exchequer and legal writer. The third Baronet assumed by Royal licence the surname of Laurie of Maxwelton in lieu of his patronymic in 1883. The fourth Baronet was a Colonel in the Army and fought in the Second Boer War. The sixth Baronet was a Major-General in the Army.

The Laurie Baronetcy, of Sevenoakes in the County of Kent, was created in the Baronetage of the United Kingdom on 30 November 1942 for John Dawson Laurie, Lord Mayor of London from 1941 to 1942. The title became extinct on his death in 1954.

Laurie baronets, of Maxwelton (1685)
Sir Robert Laurie, 1st Baronet (died 1698)
Sir Robert Laurie, 2nd Baronet (–1702)
Sir Walter Laurie, 3rd Baronet (died 1731)
Sir Robert Laurie, 4th Baronet (died 1779)
Sir Robert Laurie, 5th Baronet (–1804)
Sir Robert Laurie, 6th Baronet (1764–1848)

Bayley, later Laurie baronets, of Bedford Square (1834)

Sir John Bayley, 1st Baronet (1763–1841)
Sir John Edward George Bayley, 2nd Baronet (1793–1871)
Sir John Robert Laurie Emilius Laurie, 3rd Baronet (1823–1917) 
Sir Claude Villiers Emilius Laurie, 4th Baronet (1855–1930)
Sir Wilfrid Emilius Laurie, 5th Baronet (1859–1936)
Sir John Emilius Laurie, 6th Baronet (1892–1983)
Sir Robert Bayley Emilius Laurie, 7th Baronet (1931–2017)
Sir Andrew Ronald Emilius Laurie, 8th Baronet (1944–2021)
Sir John Christopher Emilius Laurie, 9th Baronet (born 1971).

Laurie baronets, of Sevenoakes (1942)
Sir John Dawson Laurie, 1st Baronet (1872–1954)

External links
The song Annie Laurie

References

Kidd, Charles, Williamson, David (editors). Debrett's Peerage and Baronetage (1990 edition). New York: St Martin's Press, 1990.

Baronetcies in the Baronetage of the United Kingdom
Extinct baronetcies in the Baronetage of the United Kingdom
Extinct baronetcies in the Baronetage of Nova Scotia